Csaba Burján (born 27 September 1994) is a Hungarian Olympic gold medalist short track speed skater.

References

External links

1994 births
Living people
Hungarian male short track speed skaters
Olympic short track speed skaters of Hungary
Olympic medalists in short track speed skating
Olympic gold medalists for Hungary
Short track speed skaters at the 2018 Winter Olympics
Medalists at the 2018 Winter Olympics
Sportspeople from Pécs
World Short Track Speed Skating Championships medalists
Universiade gold medalists for Hungary
Universiade medalists in short track speed skating
Competitors at the 2013 Winter Universiade
20th-century Hungarian people
21st-century Hungarian people